Kovai Chezhiyan was an Indian senior leader of the Dravidian movement, leader of the Kongu vellala gounder community and film producer who worked in the 1950s up to late 1990s. He was also the vice-chairman of the Tamil Nadu State planning commission when MGR was the Chief minister. He had produced films with famous stars including MGR, Sivaji Ganesan, Gemini Ganesan, Sivakumar, Muthuraman, NTR, Jayalalitha, Vijaykanth, Rajesh khanna, Mammooty etc. Chezhiyan, originally from Tamil Nadu, has also produced Telugu and Hindi films also and was the first president of Tamil Film producers council. He was earlier the Hononrary Secretary of the South Indian Film Chamber of Commerce. He was involved in politics and closely associated with Periyar, Anna, Kalaignar and MGR. He was the District Secretary of the DMK, and leader of the Dravidian movement in the Kongu region.

He was later introduced to Tamil films as a producer by his good friend Kavignar Kannadasan, who initially produced films with Kannadasan as partner and later individually from the movie Sumaithangi directed by Sridhar. He produced and distributed various films in Tamil, Telugu and Hindi successfully. He was the first President of the Tamil Film Producers Council.

Kovai Chezhiyan was the founder President of Kongu Vellala Goundergal Peravai. He was elected as an MLA of Kangeyam in 1971. He was also the selection committee chairman of Tamil Nadu Agricultural University. During the later part of his life he worked tirelessly for the uplifting the folks of the Kongu region and the Kongu Vellala Gounders. He was one of the main person, who along with his colleagues got the Backward Community Status for the Kongu Vellala Gounders, during the tenure of chief minister Kalaignar Karunanidhi.

He died on March 14, 2000. After his death in 2000, the Kongu Vellala Gounder Peravai constructed a memorial and arch in his native place at Kungarupalayam, near Kangayam in Tirupur district where thousands from Kongu region visit every year on his anniversary (14 March) to pay respects to him.

Kamalam Chezhiyan, wife of Kovai Chezhiyan died on April 24, 2021 due to age related ailments.

Filmography
Sumaithaangi (1962)
Ooty Varai Uravu (1967)
Kumari Kottam (1971)
Uzhaikkum Karangal (1976)
Circus Ramudu (1980)
Chandamama (1982)
Asha Jyoti (1984)
Enakku Nane Needipathi (1986)
Mounam Sammadham (1990)
Azhagan (1991)
Pudhayal(1997)

References

External links

Indian film producers
Tamil film producers
Trade unionists from Tamil Nadu
1931 births
2000 deaths
People from Tiruppur district
Film producers from Tamil Nadu